Inocencio or Inocêncio is a surname. Notable people with the surname include:
  (born 1969), Spanish botanist; her author abbreviation is "Inocencio"
 Jorge Inocêncio (born 1993), Portuguese footballer
 Kata Inocencio (born 1960), Philippinean broadcast journalist, child rights advocate, television producer and host
 Mateus Facho Inocêncio (born 1981), Brazilian athlete
 Máximo Inocencio (1833–1896), Filipino architect and businessman
 Víctor García San Inocencio (born 1958), Puerto Rican lawyer and politician See also 
 Igor Inocêncio de Oliveira (known as Igor Inocêncio; born 1998), Brazilian footballer
 Innocencio
 Innocent (name)